Lakki Marwat Subdivision formerly Frontier Region Lakki Marwat is a subdivision in Khyber Pakhtunkhwa province of Pakistan. The region is named after Lakki Marwat District which lies to the northeast. The region shares its boundary on the north with Bannu Subdivision, on the west with Tank Subdivision, to the west with North and South Waziristan and to the northeast with the district of Lakki Marwat.  Its total area is 132 square kilometers. It is administered by the district coordination officer (DCO) of Lakki Marwat District. The main settlement in Lakki Marwat subdivision is Chichindai Kalai.

Geography and climate 
Location and Area

Bhittani Subdivision is situated in one of the southern districts of Khyber Pakhtunkhwa; Lakki Marwat, Mostly Bhittani tribe reside  here and therefore, has been named after it. The region shares its boundary on the north with Bannu, on the west with Tank, to the west with North and South Waziristan and to the northeast with the district of Lakki Marwat.  Its total area is 132 square kilometers and the total population is round about 60000.

Terrain

The entire territory of this tribal area is composed of hills of medium height i.e. between 450 and 11,200 meters. The highest peak (1,216 meters) of the area is located to the south of Walai. Kharaghora is the prominent range in the southern part of the area, with an average height of almost 850 meters. Three of the important western tributaries of the Indus, namely; Kurram, Baran and Tochi rivers flow across this tribal area.

Climate

The weather of the region is extreme, with hot summers and cold winters. The summer season starts in April and continues until October. June, July and August are the hottest months. The winter season starts in November and lasts till March. December, January and February are the coldest months.

Land Use

The total cultivated area is about 33,000 acres.

Demography

Population

The total population of FR Lakki was 6,987, including 3,450 males and 3,537 females. The male to female ratio is 98/100, which is less than the national ratio of 106/100. (Source: Bureau of Statistics- FATA cell, 2012–13).

Tribes

F.R. Lakki Marwat is inhabited by Boba, Bobak and Wargara clans of the Bhittanis.

>source;MUHAMMAD BILAL,a native educational activist.

Political Administration

The Deputy Commissioner of District Lakki Marwat is responsible for the administration of Frontier Region (FR) Lakki Marwat, and manages its affairs with the help of an Assistant Political Agent (APA).

Education
According to the Alif Ailaan Pakistan District Education Rankings 2015, FR Lakki Marwat is ranked 132 out of 148 districts in terms of education. For facilities and infrastructure, the district is ranked 79 out of 148.

According to the K-P government's official data, there are a total of 69 primary schools in the region, out of which 36 are for boys while 33 are for girls.

Similarly, there are 10 middle schools, with six for boys and four for girls. There are also two high schools, with one for boys and the other for girls.

But there is not a single higher secondary school or college for either gender and most students are deprived of the prospect of ever attaining a higher education.

The tribal  Activist explicated that only a measly 2% of the total children attain higher education after bearing expenses of travelling to other districts. khan a native said that not a single girl was in the process of attaining a higher education.

Muhammad Bilal khan Bhettani while speaking to "The Express Tribune"https://profiles.google.com/?hl=en&tab=wX

See also 

Federally Administered Tribal Areas
Lakki Marwat District

References

External links
Constitutional Provisions on the Tribal Areas - Chapter 3, Part XII of the Constitution of Pakistan
Government of the Federally Administered Tribal Areas
Pakistani Federal Ministry of States and Frontier Regions

Durand Line
Frontier Regions
Frontier